Maia Wilson (born 21 September 1997) is a New Zealand netball international. She was a member of the New Zealand teams that won the 2017 Netball World Youth Cup and the 2021 Constellation Cup. She also represented New Zealand at the 2022 Commonwealth Games. Wilson made her senior league debut with Central Pulse during the 2016 ANZ Championship season. Since 2017, she has played for Northern Stars in the ANZ Premiership. In both 2018 and 2019, she was the ANZ Premiership top goal scorer. Wilson was a prominent member of the 2019 and 2022 Northern Stars teams that were ANZ Premiership grand finalists. Ahead of the 2021 season, she was appointed Stars captain. Wilson is also a former New Zealand women's basketball international.

Early life, family and education
Wilson is a Māori with Te Rarawa, Te Waiohua, Te Ākitai Waiohua and Ngāti Te Ata Waiohua affiliations. She was born in Auckland. She is the daughter of Joe and Kārena Wilson. She has one brother, Kahikatea. Her father died in 2016 from a brain tumor. She attended Mount Albert Grammar School, representing the school at both netball and basketball. Between 2016 and 2022 she attended Massey University. In May 2022, she graduated with a Bachelor of Communication, majoring in Public Relations, with a minor in Media Studies.

Basketball

School and club career
Wilson played basketball for Mount Albert Grammar School in schoolgirl competitions and for Waitakere West Lady Rangers in club competitions. In 2015 she was offered a basketball scholarship to the University of Idaho, but turned it down when she was offered a netball contract with Central Pulse.

New Zealand
In August 2014, Wilson played for New Zealand in a four-nation tournament in China. She also represented New Zealand at the 2014 FIBA Oceania Under-18 Championship for Women.

Netball

Playing career

Mount Albert
Wilson was selected for the Mount Albert Grammar School senior A team while still in Year 9, her first year at the school. Between 2012 and 2015, together with Erikana Pedersen and Jamie-Lee Price, Wilson was a member of MAGS teams that won four successive New Zealand Secondary School netball titles. The MAGS team was coached by Te Aroha Keenan. While still attending MAGS, Wilson signed a contract with Central Pulse and was invited to attend trials with the senior New Zealand team. During the 2015 NZSS tournament, Wilson scored 230 from 252 as she helped MAGS win a fourth successive title. She scored 36 from 39 as MAGS beat Saint Kentigern College 41–35 in the final. This was her last game for MAGS.

Central Pulse
Ahead of the 2016 ANZ Championship season, Wilson signed for Central Pulse. Following an injury to Jodi Brown, Wilson became a regular starter, playing alongside Ameliaranne Wells. She made her senior league debut with Pulse in a Round 1 match against Waikato Bay of Plenty Magic, scoring 34 from 38 in a 57–56 win. Wilson played just one season with Pulse, making 13 appearances and scoring 412 from 447 with a 92% success rate.

Northern Stars
Since 2017, Wilson has played for Northern Stars in the ANZ Premiership. In 2018 she was the ANZ Premiership top goal scorer. She scored 566 from 633 with an 89% success rate. On 31 March 2019, Wilson made her 50th senior league appearance while playing for Stars against Northern Mystics. In 2019, Wilson was again the ANZ Premiership top goal scorer. She scored 619 from 743 with an 83% success rate. Her goals helped the 2019 Northern Stars reach the grand final. Ahead of the 2021 season, Wilson was appointed Stars captain. On 22 May 2022, Wilson made her 100th senior league appearance while playing for Stars in a 2022 Round 11 against Mystics. Wilson subsequently captained Stars to a second grand final.

New Zealand
In 2015 and 2016, Wilson was invited to attend trials with the senior New Zealand team. She made her senior debut, aged just 19, on 14 September 2016 during a Taini Jamison Trophy Series match against Jamaica. Coming on in the final minutes of the fourth quarter, Wilson made an immediate impact, slotting her first shot on goal and going on to net three goals on debut. She was subsequently a member of the New Zealand team that won the 2017 Netball World Youth Cup.

In the opening match of the 2020 Netball Nations Cup, Wilson, in just her 11th test and second start, scored 27 from 29 against England. In the second match against Jamaica she scored 42 from 45 in a 71–45 win. She finished the tournament scoring 137 from 151 with a 91% success rate. During  the 2020 Taini Jamison Trophy Series against England, Wilson scored 116 from 127 with a 91% success rate. She was a prominent member of the New Zealand team that won the 2021 Constellation Cup. She scored 140 from 161 with an 87% success rate and was the only New Zealand player to play all 240 minutes over the series.

Statistics

Grand finals

Individual stats

|- 
! scope="row" style="text-align:center" |2016
|style="text-align:center;"|Pulse
||| ||  || || || || || || ||13  
|- style="background-color: #eaeaea"
! scope="row" style="text-align:center" |2017
|style="text-align:center;"|Stars
|||?||22||0||?||0||5||29||79||15 
|- 
! scope="row" style="text-align:center" |2018
|style="text-align:center;"|Stars
|||?||19||0||?||1||6||29||100||15  
|- style="background-color: #eaeaea"
! scope="row" style="text-align:center" |2019
|style="text-align:center;"|Stars
|||15||27||0||26||1||9||38||122||17  
|- 
! scope="row" style="text-align:center" |2020
|style="text-align:center;"|Stars
|||16||19||0||34||0||5||20||56||13 
|- style="background-color: #eaeaea"
! scope="row" style="text-align:center" |2021
|style="text-align:center;"|Stars
|||16||39||0||35||0||8||29||94||15
|- 
! scope="row" style="text-align:center" |2022
|style="text-align:center;"|Stars
|||16||32||0||32||2||6||23||87||17 
|- style="background-color: #eaeaea"
! scope="row" style="text-align:center" |2023
|style="text-align:center;"|Stars
|0/0|| ||  || || || || || || || 
|- class="sortbottom"
! colspan=2| Career
! 
! 
! 
! 
! 
! 
! 
! 
! 
! 
|}

Personal life 
Wilson has been open about her past body image struggles starting from her teenage years.

Honours
New Zealand
Constellation Cup
Winners: 2021 
Taini Jamison Trophy
Winners: 2020, 2022
Netball World Youth Cup
Winners: 2017
Fast5 Netball World Series
Winners: 2016 
Northern Stars
ANZ Premiership
Runners Up: 2019, 2021

References

1997 births
Living people
New Zealand netball players
New Zealand international netball players
New Zealand international Fast5 players
New Zealand Māori netball players
Netball players from Auckland
Northern Stars players
Central Pulse players
ANZ Championship players
ANZ Premiership players
Te Rarawa people
Te Waiohua people
Te Ākitai Waiohua people
20th-century New Zealand women
21st-century New Zealand women
New Zealand women's basketball players
People educated at Mount Albert Grammar School
Massey University alumni
Commonwealth Games bronze medallists for New Zealand
Commonwealth Games medallists in netball
Netball players at the 2022 Commonwealth Games
Medallists at the 2022 Commonwealth Games